Brandon Coutu (born September 29, 1984) is a former American-football placekicker. He was drafted by the Seattle Seahawks in the seventh round of the 2008 NFL Draft. He played college football at Georgia. He was born in Lawrenceville, Georgia.

He was also a member of the Jacksonville Jaguars, Buffalo Bills, and Las Vegas Locomotives.

College career
At the University of Georgia, he kicked three field goals of over 50 yards, his longest was 58 yards.  He never missed a PAT at Georgia and was the first kicker in Georgia history to have over 80% field goal accuracy.  All these things were accomplished after turning down scholarships at other schools for soccer and being a walk-on on Georgia's football team.

Professional career

Seattle Seahawks
Coutu was drafted by the Seattle Seahawks in the seventh round of the 2008 NFL Draft. He was one of only two kickers picked by NFL teams in that draft. He was waived by the team on September 5, 2009.

Coutu was re-signed by the Seahawks on July 30, 2011 to replace Olindo Mare. He was released on August 20.

Las Vegas Locomotives
On August 25, 2011, Coutu signed with the Las Vegas Locomotives.

Jacksonville Jaguars
On December 12, 2011, Coutu was signed to the Jacksonville Jaguars practice squad.

Buffalo Bills
Coutu signed with the Buffalo Bills on December 28, 2011 to replace the injured Rian Lindell and Dave Rayner. He is Buffalo's third kicker of the season. He attempted his first NFL field goal on a New Years Day game against the New England Patriots, but missed. He was released following the season.

Second stint with Jacksonville Jaguars
He re-signed with the Jaguars in May 2012. He was waived on July 17 to make room for newly signed Josh Scobee.

Footnote

Further reading

 Ben Shpigel, "One Game to Remember. Just One," New York Times, Nov. 22, 2017.

External links
Just Sports Stats

1984 births
Living people
People from Lawrenceville, Georgia
Sportspeople from the Atlanta metropolitan area
Players of American football from Georgia (U.S. state)
American football placekickers
Georgia Bulldogs football players
Seattle Seahawks players
Las Vegas Locomotives players
Jacksonville Jaguars players
Buffalo Bills players